Mykhailo Arkadiyovych Byelykh (born 23 December 1958 – 29 July 1997) was a former Soviet footballer and a Ukrainian coach as well as a futsal player.

External links
 
 Byelykh at ukr-football.org

1958 births
1997 deaths
People from Krasnyi Luch
Road incident deaths in Ukraine
Ukrainian footballers
Soviet footballers
Ukrainian men's futsal players
FC Shakhtar Stakhanov players
MFC Mykolaiv players
FC Kremin Kremenchuk players
Ukrainian football managers
Ukrainian Premier League managers
FC Naftokhimik Kremenchuk managers
FC Kremin Kremenchuk managers
Association football midfielders
Sportspeople from Luhansk Oblast